Turid Smedsgård is a Norwegian former handball goalkeeper. She played 113 matches for the Norway women's national handball team from 1978 onwards.  She participated at the 1982 World Women's Handball Championship, where the Norwegian team placed seventh. Smedsgård was voted best goalkeeper of the tournament.

She represented Glassverket IF and Nordstrand IF. She retired from club handball in 1994, but made a brief comeback for Bækkelagets SK in 2001.

References

External links

Year of birth missing (living people)
Living people
Norwegian female handball players